Wilkowisko, Limanowa  is a village in the administrative district of Gmina Jodłownik, within Limanowa County, Lesser Poland Voivodeship, in southern Poland.

References

Wilkowisko